Saugetia is a genus of West Indian plants in the grass family.

Species
Species include:
 Saugetia fasciculata Hitchc. & Chase — Cuba, Hispaniola
 Saugetia pleiostachya Hitchc. & Ekman — Cuba

References

Chloridoideae
Poaceae genera
Taxa named by A. S. Hitchcock